Tananger Chapel (historically called Tananger Church) is a historic parish church of the Church of Norway in Sola Municipality in Rogaland county, Norway. It is located in the village of Tananger. It used to be the church for the Tananger parish which is part of the Tungenes prosti (deanery) in the Diocese of Stavanger. The white, wooden church was built in a long church design in 1879 using designs by the architect Henrik Nissen, who adapted plans made by Hans Linstow. The church seats about 250 people. Now, the old church (now called "chapel") is used only for very special events and it can be rented for weddings.

See also
List of churches in Rogaland

References

Sola, Norway
Churches in Rogaland
Wooden churches in Norway
19th-century Church of Norway church buildings
Churches completed in 1879
1879 establishments in Norway